The 1884 United States presidential election in California was held on November 4, 1884, as part of the 1884 United States presidential election. State voters chose eight representatives, or electors, to the Electoral College, who voted for president and vice president. .

California voted for the Republican nominee, former Secretary of State James G. Blaine, by a comfortable margin, over the Democratic nominee, New York Governor Grover Cleveland.

Results

Results by county

References

California
1884
1884 California elections